The 14th Street Line, designated Routes 52, 54, is a daily bus route operated by the Washington Metropolitan Area Transit Authority between Takoma station of the Red Line of the Washington Metro and L'Enfant Plaza station (52) of the Blue, Yellow, Orange, Green, and Silver lines of the Washington Metro or Metro Center station (54) of the Red, Blue, Orange, and Silver Lines of the Washington Metro. The line operates at every 12 minutes frequencies during the day and 10-30 minutes during late night service. Trips roughly take 40-60 minutes to complete. Select trips begin/end at 14th Street & Colorado Avenue NW as well.

Background

The 14th Street Line is one of the most heavily used routes in the Metrobus system with about 15,000 riders using these buses on a typical weekday. Those routes connect Takoma station to Downtown DC via 14th Street. However, the routes suffer from crowding, delays, traffic, and ineffectiveness due to the routes having at least 26 stops and the frequency of buses is at least 20 minutes. This led to residents opting for the more efficient 16th Street buses (the S1, S2, S4, and S9) prior to 2017.

Routes 52 and 54 operate daily 24 hours a day between Takoma station and L'Enfant Plaza station or Metro Center station, running along the 14th Street corridor and connecting many neighborhoods to various Metro stations. Route 52 only serves Takoma station during the early mornings and late nights daily, terminating at 14th Street and Colorado Avenue NW during most of the day. Route 54 operates at all times to Takoma station. Additionally, select route 54 trips are operated during school days from 14th & Aspen Streets NW or Reeves Center going northbound.

Route 52 currently operates out of Western division with a few select early morning weekday trips operating out of Bladensburg division while Route 54 operates out of Bladensburg division during weekdays and Western division during weekends. It originally operated out of Northern division until 2019 when it was closed. At one point, routes 52 and 54 utilized articulated buses, but later stopped using them on a regular basis.

History

The line was originally operated under the Capital Traction Company which began service in 1895. Congress authorized the Rock Creek Railway to purchase and merge with any connecting company, and to change its name which was implemented on September 21, 1895. This merger took place with the Washington and Georgetown on September 21, 1895.

In 1896, the former Rock Creek line experimented with a new power system on U Street NW between 9th Street NW and 18th Street NW. The Love system transmitted electricity through a set of trolley wheels running on underground conduit rails instead of through the sliding shoe used elsewhere. While the system worked it was more expensive to install. In the spring of 1899 it was replaced with the sliding shoe and the line continued to the Calvert Street Loop.

Meanwhile the branch of the Pennsylvania Avenue Line from the east edge of the White House northeast on New York Avenue and north on 14th Street Northwest to Florida Avenue, part of the original charter, was opened November 15, 1862. A law passed June 30, 1864 allowed it to continue the line north; it was eventually extended to Park Road and later to Colorado Avenue, where it connected to the Washington and Maryland Line.

The line was originally run by cable cars but was electrified after the powerhouse along 14th street burnt down. The line was later electrified on February 27, 1898. The Pennsylvania Avenue Line and 7th Street Line later followed in 1898.

By the 1920s, cars were turned at four northern terminals: Park Road, Decatur Street, Colorado Avenue, and Takoma (via the Washington and Maryland Line). Some Park Road cars turned west on Pennsylvania Avenue, while cars from all four terminals turned east. 14th Street was also used by Chevy Chase Line cars to Chevy Chase Lake, which turned off at the U Street Line. 

The North American Company, a transit and utilities holding company began to acquire stock in the Washington Railway in 1922, gaining a controlling interest by 1928. By December 31, 1933, it owned 50.016% of the voting stock. North American tried to purchase Capital Traction, but Capital Traction always remained widely owned by the residents of Washington, without a principal stock holder. North American never owned more than 2.5% of Capital Traction stock.

Nonetheless the Great Depression proved difficult for the transit companies and so to survive, on December 1, 1933 Washington Railway, Capital Traction, and Washington Rapid Transit merged to form the Capital Transit Company. Washington Railway continued as a holding company, owning 50% of Capital Transit and 100% of PEPCO, but Capital Traction was later dissolved. For the first time street railways in Washington were under the management of one company.

After the 1933 consolidation, the Fourteenth Street Line was combined with part of the ex-Washington Railway and Electric Company Fourth Street Line, which used Fourteenth Street from the White House south to the Bureau of Engraving, where a new underground terminal was built. It later formed routes 50, 52, and 54 which were used the old Fourteenth Street Line, running respectively to the Bureau of Engraving, the ex-WR&E Eleventh Street Line (via U Street), and the Pennsylvania Avenue Line to the Navy Yard. Route 52 was discontinued which ran to U street and 11th Street, but 50 and 54 remained until January 28, 1962. 

Routes 50 and 54 were later acquired to run by buses under DC Transit when streetcars began to phase out. Routes 50 and 54 operated from Takoma and Bureau of Engraving and Printing (50) and Navy Yard (54) primarily running along 14th Street. Route 52 would also be reincarnated to operate a similar pattern to route 52 but altered slightly running via Independence Avenue, 12th Street, and D street. Most trips would end at 14th and Colorado while some trips are extended to Takoma. Routes 50, 52, and 54 eventually became Metrobus routes on February 4, 1973 when WMATA acquired DC Transit and three other transit agencies.

Other routes that weren't formed under the Metrobus tag were the 56 and 58. Route 56 operated from Summit Hills Apartments to the Bureau of Engraving and route 58 operated to Takoma. Route 56 was later renamed routes 50, 52, and 54 when the merger happened in 1973 while route 58 was later renamed route K8.

On February 6, 1978, routes 50, 52, and 54 were rerouted to serve the newly opened Takoma station in order to connect riders to the Washington Metro.

During the mid-1990s, route 50 was discontinued, route 52 was shortened to L'Enfant Plaza station, and route 54 was shortened to Federal Triangle. Route 54 was later  extended to the L'Enfant Plaza station during the 1990s. Several years after route 50 was eliminated, a new route 53 was introduced to operate along the former route 50 routing between Takoma station and the Bureau of Engraving. It was then later shortened to Federal Triangle and then later shorten to Franklin Square/McPherson Square station.

In 2015, WMATA proposed to cut back the 54 to McPherson Square station due to low ridership south of the station. Service to Archives station and L'Enfant Plaza station would be discontinued. But it was also proposed to improve the frequency of buses between Takoma station and 14th Street and Colorado due to high ridership volume.

On June 26, 2016, route 54 was shorten to Federal Triangle with alternative service provided by routes 52 and 53. However, the frequency of buses increased between Takoma station and 14th Street and Colorado.

In 2017, WMATA proposed many changes to the 52, 53, and 54.

WMATA proposed to reroute Route 52 to serve the Wharf development via 12th Street, Maine Avenue, and 7th Street SW to and from L'Enfant Plaza station. WMATA also proposed to combine routes 53 and 54 into a new route 54 operating to and from Metro Center station (12th and F Streets NW) shortening route 54 even further. WMATA would also adjust the weekday schedule to coordinate local route 52 and 54 service with a proposed new MetroExtra limited-stop route 59, serve the Wharf, and decrease the time between buses to Takoma station.

These proposed changes were in order to provide service to the new Wharf development, coordinate schedules with new route 59 limited-stop service, simplify 14th Street service and route designations, alleviate bus congestion at Franklin Square, and responds to requests by the District of Columbia and District Department of Transportation. Performance measures for routes 52, 53, and 54 goes as the following:

If the changes are approved, the changes will be implemented as soon as December 2017.

At the time of the proposals, route 52 and 54 would mainly operate up to 14th Street and Colorado and would only run to Takoma station during select times and Sundays (it would start at Takoma station however). Route 53 would operate between Monday and Saturday only its full route.

On June 13, 2017, the DC Council and DC Mayor Muriel Bowser approved WMATA's FY2018 budget (a $1.2 million budget) which includes the new limited stop route and reconstructed service along 14th Street. Changes will be implemented as soon as December 2017.

On December 17, 2017, route 52 was extended along 12th Street and Maine Avenue SW in order to serve the Wharf development to and from L'Enfant Plaza station with most service along D Street being discontinued. Routes 53 and 54 were combined into one route operating between Takoma station and Metro Center station (F & 12th streets NW) with the 53 designation and service to Federal Triangle being discontinued.

A new route 59 limited-stop route was also introduced to operate alongside routes 52 and 54 between Takoma station and Federal Triangle which replaced the 54 portion between Metro Center and Federal Triangle and fully replaced route 53. Service began on January 8, 2018.

In 2019 during WMATA's FY2021 year, WMATA proposed to replace route 54 and give route 59 daily service. Route 59 will operate every 8 minutes during peak hours and during the same span as route 54 during off peak hours and weekends. However, the route will become a local route between 14th and Colorado and Takoma station serving all stops in between the two points. This was due to the following reasons:
 To streamline service and simplify the route structure making service easier for customers to understand.
 To provide all-day, 7-day-a-week limited-stop service on 14th Street to complement DDOT's planned 14th Street bus priority projects in Columbia Heights.
 To maintain frequent service on upper 14th Street north of Colorado Avenue, Aspen Street and Butternut Street, where there is one travel lane in each direction and it is difficult for MetroExtra buses to pass local buses.
About 4,800 riders board Route 52 or 54 local service at stops south of 14th Street & Colorado Avenue that are not served by route 59, which would see a 50% reduction in frequency of local service. This is approximately 38% of the total 12,800 riders that board all 52, 54 buses on an average weekday according to WMATA. Approximate frequency at stops south of Colorado Avenue would be as follows:

If the proposals were to gone through, routes 52 and 59 would be the only two routes running along the 14th Street Corridor. However, WMATA later backed out the proposals due to customer pushback on April 2, 2020.

During the COVID-19 pandemic, the line was reduced to operate on its Saturday supplemental schedule during the weekdays beginning on March 16, 2020. On March 18, 2020, the line was further reduced to operate on its Sunday schedule. On March 21, 2020, weekend service on the 52 became suspended and Route 54 was reduced to operate every 30 minutes. Service was restored to its full service on August 23, 2020.

On September 5, 2021, the frequency between buses improved to every 12 minutes daily.

References

1895 establishments in Washington, D.C.
52
Street railways in Washington, D.C.